The Pembrokeshire Senior Cup is a football knockout tournament involving teams from in Pembrokeshire, West Wales who play in leagues administered and associated with the Pembrokeshire Association Football League.

Competition history

Past winners
Since the league began the following clubs have been senior cup winners:

1940s

1946–47: – RNAS Dale
1947–48: – Narberth
1948–49: – Pembroke Borough
1949–50: – HMS Harrier

1950s

1950–51: – RAF (Pembroke Dock)
1951–52: – Goodwick United
1952–53: – RAF (Pembroke Dock)
1953–54: – RA Manobier
1954–55: – Goodwick United
1955–56: – RAF (Pembroke Dock)
1956–57: – Narberth
1957–58: – Clynderwen
1958–59 – Hakin United
1959–60: – Milford United

1960s

1960–61: – Milford United
1961–62: – Milford United
1962–63: – Milford United
1963–64: – HMS Goldcrest
1964–65: – Fishguard Sports
1965–66: – Fishguard Sports
1966–67: – Fishguard Sports
1967–68: – Fishguard Sports
1968–69: – Hakin United
1969–70: – HMS Goldcrest

1970s

1970–71: – Final not played
1971–72: – Fishguard Sports
1972–73: – Fishguard Sports
1973–74: – Carew
1974–75: – Fishguard Sports
1975–76: – Carew
1976–77: – Monkton Swifts
1977–78: – Merlins Bridge
1978–79: – Merlins Bridge
1979–80: – Merlins Bridge

1980s

1980–81: – Monkton Swifts
1981–82: – Johnston
1982–83: – New Hedges/ Saundersfoot
1983–84: – Carew
1984–85: – Johnston
1985–86: – Carew
1986–87: – Merlins Bridge
1987–88: – Goodwick United
1988–89: – Fishguard Sports
1989–90: – Merlins Bridge

1990s

1990–91: – New Hedges/ Saundersfoot
1991–92: – New Hedges/ Saundersfoot
1992–93: – Monkton Swifts
1993–94: – Saundersfoot Sports
1994–95: – Narberth
1995–96: – Merlins Bridge
1996–97: – Pennar Robins
1997–98: – Narberth
1998–99: – Goodwick United 
1999–2000: –  Hakin United

2000s

2000–01: – Hakin United
2001–02: – Hakin United
2002–03: – Hakin United
2003–04: – Merlins Bridge
2004–05: – St Ishmaels
2005–06: – Hakin United
2006–07: – Monkton Swifts
2007–08: – Pennar Robins
2008–09: – Hakin United
2009–10: – Goodwick United

2010s

2010–11: – Hakin United
2011–12: – Hakin United
2012–13: – Johnston
2013–14: – Tenby
2014–15: – Goodwick United
2015–16: – Goodwick United
2016–17: – Merlins Bridge
2017–18: – Hakin United
2018–19: – Merlins Bridge
2019–20: – 'Competition cancelled due to the COVID-19 pandemic2020s

2020–21: – Competition cancelled due to the COVID-19 pandemic''
2021–22: – Hakin United

Number of cup wins by clubs (since 1946–47)

Hakin United – 12 
Merlins Bridge – 9
Fishguard Sports – 8
Goodwick United – 7
Carew – 4
Milford United – 4
Monkton Swifts – 4
Narberth – 4
Johnston – 3 
New Hedges/Saundersfoot – 3
RAF (Pembroke Dock) – 3
HMS Goldcrest – 2 
Pennar Robbins – 2 
Clynderwen – 1
HMS Harrier – 1 
Pembroke Borough – 1
RA Manorbier – 1
RNAS Dale – 1 
Saundersfoot Sports – 1 
St Ishmaels – 1 
Tenby – 1

See also
Carmarthenshire Senior Cup - a similar competition in neighbouring Carmarthenshire.

Notes and references

External links
Official League website

Football cup competitions in Wales
County Cup competitions
Football in Wales